James Gerry (August 14, 1796 – July 19, 1873) was a Democratic member of the U.S. House of Representatives from Pennsylvania.

Biography
James Gerry was born near Rising Sun, Maryland.  He pursued an academic course and was graduated from West Nottingham Academy.  He studied medicine at the University of Maryland in Baltimore, Maryland, and commenced practice in Shrewsbury, Pennsylvania, in 1824.

Gerry was elected as a Democrat to the Twenty-sixth and Twenty-seventh Congresses.  He continued the practice of medicine until 1870, when he retired.  He died in Shrewsbury, York County, Pennsylvania, in 1873.  Interment in Lutheran Cemetery.

Sources

The Political Graveyard

Physicians from Pennsylvania
People from York County, Pennsylvania
People from Rising Sun, Maryland
University of Maryland, Baltimore alumni
University of Maryland School of Medicine alumni
American Lutherans
1796 births
1873 deaths
Democratic Party members of the United States House of Representatives from Pennsylvania
19th-century American politicians
19th-century Lutherans